Kemetic yoga is a system of yoga which involves a combination of physical movements, deep breathing techniques and meditation. Developed in the 1970s, this form of yoga is inspired by Ancient Egyptian hieroglyphs. It has an emphasis on breathing patterns, and also inculcates the philosophies of self-development, healing of mind-body-spirit and self-discovery.

Kemetic yoga's practice was developed in the 20th century by claiming association with some hieroglyphic texts from ancient Egypt as well as the wall carvings and paintings on Egyptian temples which portray pharaohs in stretching postures. A small research conducted in the 1970s by yoga professionals Asar Hapi and Yirser Ra Hotep is said to have resulted in the development of what is known as Kemetic yoga.

Symbolism
The Kemetic term for the practice is "Smai Tawi", which means joining the lands of upper Kemet and lower Kemet, and is represented with gods Heru and Sebek tying ropes around the Smai symbol, which depicts spine and lungs. The symbol asserts the "use of breath as the life-force opening the energy centers along the spine and brain that enlighten human consciousness."

The movements in the practice of Kemetic yoga is said to imitate the poses prescribed for attaining enlightenment, the highest spiritual level indicated by the neteru (Kemetic deities and nature spirits). The goal of the practice is said to be "attaining divine spiritual wisdom" which is represented by the symbol of uraeus (upright Egyptian cobra) coming from the third eye of the pharaoh. As pharaoh represented the leader of the two lands, the symbol can be interpreted as uniting two human entities, body-mind and soul-spirit, for mastering the life force through the practice of yoga.

Modern development

The development of Kemetic yoga was started in the 1970s by claiming association with, translating and interpreting ancient hieroglyphic texts called Medu Neter. Images resembling stretching and meditation poses which were found in Egypt were used in the creation of Kemetic yoga's asanas. The mantras associated with Kemetic yoga are composed in ancient African languages. A researcher from Chicago, Asar Hapi, spread the practice of Kemetic yoga by traveling across the US, while yoga master Yirser Ra Hotep trained and certified instructors, teaching them forms of Kemetic yoga.

Wellness tourism
Kemetic yoga has contributed to Egypt's wellness tourism, with the country's Ministry of Tourism promoting it internationally. In 2019, CNN broadcast a short documentary called "Yoga in Egypt", in collaboration with Egypt's Ministry of Tourism.

See also
 Kemetism
 Egyptian mythology
 Ancient Egyptian religion

References

Further reading
Introduction to Kemetic Yoga: The Fundamental Teachings of Mystic Integration that Were Established by the Shemsu Nebedjer by 5000-10000 BCE: 
Egyptian Yoga Volume 2:

External links
History of Kemetic yoga

Yoga styles